Eucutta is an unincorporated community in Wayne County, in the U.S. state of Mississippi.

History
The community takes its name from Eucutta Creek, which flows near the site. A post office called Eucutta was established in 1835, and remained in operation until 1911.

References

Unincorporated communities in Mississippi
Unincorporated communities in Wayne County, Mississippi
Mississippi placenames of Native American origin